Alan Keith Colin Jones (born 20 April 1951) is an English former cricketer. Jones was a right-handed batsman who bowled right-arm medium pace. He was born at Solihull, Warwickshire, and was educated at Solihull School and St Edmund Hall, Oxford.

Keith Jones made his first-class debut for Warwickshire against Scotland at Edgbaston in 1969. His next first-class appearance came during his university studies for Oxford University against Warwickshire. He made 28 further first-class appearances for the university, the last of which came in The University Match of 1973 against Cambridge University at Lord's. In his 29 first-class appearances for the university, Jones scored 1,102 runs at an average of 21.19, with a highest score of 111 against Nottinghamshire in 1971. He also made two first-class appearances for a combined Oxford and Cambridge Universities team, against the touring Australians in 1972 and the touring New Zealanders in 1973. It was for Oxford University that he also made his List A debut for in the 1973 Benson & Hedges Cup against Leicestershire. He made three further appearances in that season's competition, against Warwickshire, Northamptonshire and Worcestershire. He scored a total of 153 runs in these matches, at an average of 38.25 and with a high score of 82, which came against Northamptonshire.

Following the end of his studies in 1973, Jones returned to Warwickshire, where he played a half a dozen matches for the county at the end of the 1973 season. He made three first-class appearances in the County Championship against Kent, Middlesex and Gloucestershire, as well as making three List A appearances in the John Player League against Surrey, Worcestershire and Gloucestershire.

References

External links
Keith Jones at ESPNcricinfo
Keith Jones at CricketArchive

1951 births
Living people
Sportspeople from Solihull
People educated at Solihull School
Alumni of St Edmund Hall, Oxford
English cricketers
Warwickshire cricketers
Oxford University cricketers
Oxford and Cambridge Universities cricketers